Moussa Sissako (born 10 November 2000) is a professional footballer who plays as a defender for Russian Premier League club Sochi. Born in France, he plays for the Mali national team.

Club career

Paris Saint-Germain 
Sissako joined Paris Saint-Germain from RC France in 2012. He signed his first professional contract on 1 June 2018, a deal that linked him with PSG until 30 June 2021. During the 2017–18 and 2018–19 seasons, Sissako played for PSG's B team, making a total of 24 appearances and scoring 1 goal.

Standard Liège 
On 28 January 2020, Sissako joined Belgian club Standard Liège on a six-month loan with an option to buy. At the end of the season, the deal was made permanent for a fee of €400,000. He made his professional debut in a 4–1 Belgian Cup win over Seraing on 3 February 2021.

Sochi 
On 1 September 2022, Sissako joined Russian Premier League club Sochi.

International career 
Born in France, Sissako is of Malian descent. He has regularly been called up to play with the France youth teams in the past. He was called up by the Mali U23 team for the 2019 Africa U-23 Cup of Nations, but was not capped. He debuted for the senior Mali national team in a 5–0 FIFA World Cup qualification win over Kenya on 7 October 2021.

Style of play 
Usually a left-sided centre-back, Sissako is versatile enough to play on both central defensive positions of a back four. He occasionally plays on the right side of a back three, and sometimes as the central defender in a back five. He is good with both of his feet. PSG youth coach François Rodrigues has described Sissako as a player that is "very aggressive on the field".

Personal life 
One of his brothers, Abdoulaye, is also a footballer. Souleymane, his other brother, is his adviser.

In October 2020, Sissako tested positive for COVID-19, along with several of his teammates at Standard Liège.

Career statistics

Honours 
Standard Liège

 Belgian Cup runner-up: 2020–21

References

External links 
 

2000 births
Sportspeople from Clichy, Hauts-de-Seine
Footballers from Hauts-de-Seine
Citizens of Mali through descent
French sportspeople of Malian descent
Living people
French footballers
Malian footballers
Mali international footballers
Association football defenders
Racing Club de France Football players
Paris Saint-Germain F.C. players
Standard Liège players
PFC Sochi players
Championnat National 2 players
Belgian Pro League players
Russian Premier League players
2021 Africa Cup of Nations players
Malian expatriate footballers
French expatriate footballers
Expatriate footballers in Belgium
Malian expatriate sportspeople in Belgium
French expatriate sportspeople in Belgium
Expatriate footballers in Russia
Malian expatriate sportspeople in Russia
French expatriate sportspeople in Russia